Wertenbaker is a common American surname that may refer to:
 Charles Christian Wertenbaker (1901–1955), was an American journalist Time (magazine) and author.
 Green Peyton Wertenbaker (1907–1968), was an American journalist and SF-writer.
 Thomas Jefferson Wertenbaker (1879–1966) was a leading American historian and Edwards Professor of American History  at Princeton University. 
 Timberlake Wertenbaker (born 1951), is a British playwright, screenplay writer, and translator.
 William C. "Bill" Wertenbaker (1875–1933) was an American football coach.